Edin Ademović (born 2 October 1987) is a Serbian–Bosnian footballer who most recently played for FK Radnik Bijeljina.

Club career
Born in the Serbian capital Belgrade, he started his youth-career at local power-house FK Partizan. He begin his senior career at Bosnian club FK Sarajevo, and since then he played with Serbian FK Kolubara, Turkish Kasimpasa SK, Bulgarian A PFG Belasitsa Petrich and Turkish Second League Giresunspor. After he played for Giresunspor he moved back to Serbia and played in Serbian First League in FK Sevojno. 2010 he debuted in Serbian SuperLiga with Sloboda Sevojno.

In December 2016 he signed a two-year contract with Bosnian side FK Radnik Bijeljina.

Honours
Vardar
Macedonian Super Cup: 2013

References

External links
Profile and stats at Srbijafudbal.
Weltfussball.de
Edin Ademović Stats at Utakmica.rs
Edin Ademović at Footballdatabase

1987 births
Living people
Footballers from Belgrade
Association football forwards
Bosnia and Herzegovina footballers
FK Sarajevo players
FK Kolubara players
Kasımpaşa S.K. footballers
PFC Belasitsa Petrich players
Giresunspor footballers
FK Sevojno players
FK Sloboda Užice players
FK Novi Pazar players
FK BSK Borča players
FK Vardar players
FK Radnik Bijeljina players
Premier League of Bosnia and Herzegovina players
Serbian First League players
Süper Lig players
TFF First League players
First Professional Football League (Bulgaria) players
Serbian SuperLiga players
Macedonian First Football League players
Bosnia and Herzegovina expatriate footballers
Expatriate footballers in Turkey
Bosnia and Herzegovina expatriate sportspeople in Turkey
Expatriate footballers in Bulgaria
Bosnia and Herzegovina expatriate sportspeople in Bulgaria
Expatriate footballers in North Macedonia
Bosnia and Herzegovina expatriate sportspeople in North Macedonia